Sainkhuugiin Ganbaatar (born 30 July 1970) is a Mongolian politician.

He served as a Member of State Great Khural from 2012 to 2016 and the Mongolian People's Revolutionary Party's nominee for President of Mongolia in the 2017 election (3rd place, 30.61% votes). Ganbaatar was elected again to the State Great Khural in the 2020 Mongolian legislative election. He left the MPRP in April 2021 following their merger with the Mongolian People's Party and joined the Democratic Party.

References

Members of the State Great Khural
1970 births
Living people